José Inocente Lugo Gómez Tagle (25 December 1871 – 26 November 1963) was a Mexican lawyer and politician who served as governor of the State of Guerrero.

Governors of Guerrero
Governors of Baja California
20th-century Mexican lawyers
1871 births
1963 deaths
Politicians from Guerrero
Mexican Secretaries of the Interior
20th-century Mexican politicians